Doris Blake (2 November 1911 – 12 July 1983) was a British gymnast. She competed in the women's artistic team all-around event at the 1936 Summer Olympics.

References

1911 births
1983 deaths
British female artistic gymnasts
Olympic gymnasts of Great Britain
Gymnasts at the 1936 Summer Olympics
Sportspeople from London